Pan'kivka, also known as Pan'kovka, is a village in Luhansk Oblast (province) of Ukraine. The village's population is 34 (as of 2001).

Administratively, Pan'kivka belongs to the Luhansk Raion (district) of the oblast as a part of the Veselogirs'ka local council.

Peace Pagoda Building 

The northern outskirts of the village adjoin a chalk mountain slope named Zmiyina. Eastwardly of the Ancient Mound on it, a Peace Pagoda or Stupa is being built by the international sect of Buddhist monks Nipponzan Myohoji.

The Stupa is being financed by donations and voluntary labor, following many years labor by all the monks of the sect.

The scheme was started by monk Roman Turchin, who gave his life working towards the first Ukrainian Peace Pagoda. The project passed to Sergei Zhdankin when Turchin died.

Before joining Pan'kivka, the monks were going to start with Stupa on the All Religions Mount at Kam'yanka (Lutuhyne Raion, Luhansk Oblast). That place April 28, 2003 Roman Turchin initiated and with Nikolay Tarasenko organized celebrating the 750th anniversary of Namu-Myo-Ho-Ren-Ge-Kyo, which brought together a large number of guests.

Over time, on the recommendation of Nicholay Tarasenko and other reasons, it was decided to move the mission to Pan'kivka.

The monks who came to the Sect in the post-Soviet era have found in Pan'kivka the place for their Peace Pagoda building, and were inspired by, and visited a Teacher of the  Nipponzan Myohoji Sect in Eurasia — Junsei Terasawa, who is well known for having built the first Peace Pagoda in the West, the Milton Keynes Peace Pagoda, and also the London Peace Pagoda.

See also 
 Kam'yanka. All Religions Mount
 Namu-Myo-Ho-Ren-Ge-Kyo
 Peace Pagoda, London, England
 Peace Pagoda, Milton Keynes, England
 Terasawa Junsei

Notes

References

Further reading 
 
 
 
 
 
 
 

Villages in Luhansk Raion